Ujung Kulon National Park is at the westernmost tip of Java, in Banten province of Indonesia. It includes the volcanic island group of Krakatoa in Lampung province, and other islands including Panaitan, as well as smaller offshore islets such as Handeuleum and Peucang in the Sunda Strait.

Ujung Kulon means  Western End or Point West.

Geography
This caused the total evacuation of the peninsula by humans, thereby allowing it to become a repository for much of Java’s flora and fauna, and most of the remaining lowland forest on the island.

History

It is Indonesia's first proposed national park and was declared a UNESCO World Heritage Site in 1991 for containing the largest remaining lowland rainforest in Java. The 1883 eruption of Krakatoa and its tsunami wiped out many settlements in the later park area, and they were never repopulated.

Parts of today's national park and World Heritage site have been protected since the early 20th century. Krakatoa (or rather, the three islets which remain of it) was declared as a Nature Reserve in 1921, followed by Pulau Panaitan and Pulau Peucang Nature Reserve in 1937, the Ujung Kulon Nature Reserve in 1958, the Gunung Honje Nature Reserve in 1967, and most recently Ujung Kulon National Park in 1992. In 2005 the park was designated as an ASEAN Heritage Park.

Flora and fauna
Ujung Kulon is the last known refuge for the critically endangered Javan rhinoceros after poachers killed the last remaining rhino in Cát Tiên National Park of Vietnam, where a small population of 10 or less remained in 2010. In Ujung Kulon the population has been estimated at 40-60 in the 1980s. Within 2001-2010 there have been 14 rhino births identified using camera and video traps. Based on recordings taken between February and October 2011, 35 rhinoceros have been identified, of which 22 were males and 13 females. Of these 7 were old, 18 adults, 5 youngsters, and 5 infant rhinos. Increasing from previous years, in 2013 there were 8 calves which 3 of them were female and 50 teenage and adult which 20 of them were female identified using 120 video cameras functioning at night with motion sensors. It was accurate data, because every rhino has unique morphology as finger print, mainly skin wrinkles around the eyes.

By 2013 feeding areas of Eupatorium odoratum vegetation have been reduced from 10 locations comprising  to 5 locations comprising . Thus competition for feeding ground between the solitary rhinoceros and banteng also increased.

The park also protects 57 rare species of plant. The 35 mammal species include banteng, silvery gibbon, Javan lutung, crab-eating macaque, Javan leopard, Sumatran dhole, Java mouse-deer, Javan rusa, and smooth-coated otter. There are also 72 species of reptiles and amphibians, and 240 species of birds.

The status of crocodiles within the park is largely unknown; sightings are rare and occur occasionally. There are reports of the false gharial within the park, but these are not confirmed. In addition, the saltwater crocodile was historically present throughout Java's coastal river systems but is currently extirpated in these regions. Small, isolated populations of the saltwater crocodile are reported to exist within Ujung Kulon but confirmation is needed.

Extinct

Javan tigers survived in the protected area until the mid-1960s.

See also

 Andries Hoogerwerf, naturalist active in the conservation of Ujung Kulon in the 1930s-40s.
 National parks of Indonesia
 Protected areas of Indonesia

References

External links

 
 Ujung Kulon National Park at UNESCO World Heritage website.
 

Pandeglang Regency
World Heritage Sites in Indonesia
National parks of Indonesia
ASEAN heritage parks
Sunda Strait
Geography of Banten
Tourist attractions in Banten